Lina Ramann (July 24, 1833 – March 30, 1912) was a German writer and teacher known for her books on the Hungarian composer and pianist Franz Liszt. Between 1874 and Liszt's death in 1886, she interviewed him and had access to all of his manuscripts and publications in his library. She wrote his authorized biography and the first in-depth critical analysis of his works, all of which were published in three volumes as Franz Liszt als Künstler und Mensch ("Franz Liszt, the artist and man") between 1880 and 1894.

1833 births
1912 deaths
German biographers
German women biographers
19th-century German women writers
19th-century German writers
Liszt scholars